Vocabulary mismatch is a common phenomenon in the usage of natural languages, occurring when different people name the same thing or concept differently.

Furnas et al. (1987) were perhaps the first to quantitatively study the vocabulary mismatch problem.  Their results show that on average 80% of the times different people (experts in the same field) will name the same thing differently.  There are usually tens of possible names that can be attributed to the same thing.  This research motivated the work on latent semantic indexing.

The vocabulary mismatch between user created queries and relevant documents in a corpus causes the term mismatch problem in information retrieval.  Zhao and Callan (2010) were perhaps the first to quantitatively study the vocabulary mismatch problem in a retrieval setting.  Their results show that an average query term fails to appear in 30-40% of the documents that are relevant to the user query.  They also showed that this probability of mismatch is a central probability in one of the fundamental probabilistic retrieval models, the Binary Independence Model.  They developed novel term weight prediction methods that can lead to potentially 50-80% accuracy gains in retrieval over strong keyword retrieval models.  Further research along the line shows that expert users can use Boolean Conjunctive Normal Form expansion to improve retrieval performance by 50-300% over unexpanded keyword queries.

Techniques that may reduce mismatch 

 Stemming
 Full-text indexing instead of only indexing keywords or abstracts
 Indexing text on inbound links from other documents (or other social tagging
 Query expansion.  A 2012 study by Zhao and Callan using expert created manual Conjunctive normal form queries has shown that searchonym expansion in the Boolean conjunctive normal form is much more effective than the traditional bag of word expansion e.g. Rocchio expansion.
 Translation-based models

References 

Linguistic research
Information retrieval techniques
Natural language processing